DNA (cytosine-5)-methyltransferase 3 beta, is an enzyme that in humans in encoded by the DNMT3B gene.  Mutation in this gene are associated with immunodeficiency, centromere instability and facial anomalies syndrome.

Function 

CpG methylation is an epigenetic modification that is important for embryonic development, imprinting, and X-chromosome inactivation. Studies in mice have demonstrated that DNA methylation is required for mammalian development. This gene encodes a DNA methyltransferase which is thought to function in de novo methylation, rather than maintenance methylation. The protein localizes primarily to the nucleus and its expression is developmentally regulated. Eight alternatively spliced transcript variants have been described. The full length sequences of variants 4 and 5 have not been determined.

Clinical significance 

Immunodeficiency-centromeric instability-facial anomalies (ICF) syndrome is a result of defects in lymphocyte maturation resulting from aberrant DNA methylation caused by mutations in the DNMT3B gene.

Variants of the gene can also contribute to nicotine dependency.

Interactions 

DNMT3B has been shown to interact with:

 CBX5, 
 DNMT1, 
 DNMT3A, 
 KIF4A, 
 NCAPG, 
 SMC2, 
 SUMO1  and
 UBE2I.

References

Further reading

External links